Ban-e Vizeh (also Romanized as Bān-e Vīzeh; also known as Bāndūzeh,  Banwīza, and Bon Vaz) is a village in Arkavazi Rural District, Chavar District, Ilam County, Ilam Province, Iran. At the 2006 census, its population was 201, in 49 families. The village is populated by Kurds.

Notable people 

 Khulam Rada Khan Arkawazi

References 

Populated places in Ilam County
Kurdish settlements in Ilam Province